Lintgen railway station is a railway station serving Lintgen, in central Luxembourg.  It is operated by Chemins de Fer Luxembourgeois, the state-owned railway company.

The station is situated on Line 10, which connects Luxembourg City to the centre and north of the country.

External links
 Official CFL page on Lintgen station
 Rail.lu page on Lintgen station

Railway station
Railway stations in Luxembourg
Railway stations on CFL Line 10